James Martin was a Republican state legislator in South Carolina during the Reconstruction Era. He was born in Ireland, and his family moved to South Carolina when he was young. He worked in the mercantile business, married Anna Eliza, and had five children. After the Civil War, he was elected to the South Carolina House of Representatives, representing Abbeville County. He was assassinated on October 5, 1868, possibly by the Ku Klux Klan. Before his death, it was perceived that he had made "certain inflammatory appeals" to blacks.

References

1868 deaths
19th-century births
Republican Party members of the South Carolina House of Representatives
People from Abbeville, South Carolina
1868 murders in the United States
Irish emigrants to the United States (before 1923)
People murdered in South Carolina
People of the Reconstruction Era
Assassinated American politicians
Year of birth missing
19th-century American politicians